Freedom philosophy may refer to:

 Libertarianism
 Classical liberalism